WFSP is a News/Talk formatted broadcast radio station.  The station is licensed to Kingwood, West Virginia and serves Kingwood and Preston County in West Virginia.  WFSP is owned by David Wills and operated under their WFSP Radio, LLC licensee.

Sold

On June 6, 2013, WFSP and sister station WFSP-FM were sold to Kingwood-based WFSP Radio, LLC for $500,000.  The sale was closed on September 30, 2013.

See also
 WFSP's Studios and Tower on Google StreetView

References

External links
 NewsTalk 1560 WFSP Online
 
 

1967 establishments in West Virginia
News and talk radio stations in the United States
Radio stations established in 1967
FSP
FSP